Mondo Ride is a multinational vehicle for hire founded in UAE by Troels Andersen (chief executive officer) and Mo Shahin (chief technology officer) and based in Nairobi, Kenya. The firm operates the Mondo ride mobile app which allows consumers to use their smartphones to request transport which is then routed to Mondo Ride drivers. The company was formed in 2015 by Himanshu Anand. , the service was available in Kenya. In February 2018, there were fears that the company was exiting the country when accounts were suspended due to a delay in payments. 

In 2016, the company started operations in Nairobi, Kenya, where it competes primarily with Uber. It operates in Nairobi, Mombasa, Kampala, Kisumu and Dar es Salaam in Tanzania. Its corporate transportation offering has more than 100 clients across the region.

References

Ridesharing companies
Road transport in the United Arab Emirates
Online companies of the United Arab Emirates
Transport companies of the United Arab Emirates
Transport companies established in 2014
Emirati companies established in 2014